Babylon Berlin is a German neo-noir television series. Created, written, and directed by Tom Tykwer, Achim von Borries, and Hendrik Handloegten.  It is loosely based on novels by German author Volker Kutscher.

The series premiered on 13 October 2017 on Sky 1, a German-language entertainment channel broadcast by Sky Deutschland. The first release consisted of a continuous run of 16  episodes, with the first eight officially known as Season 1, and the second eight known as Season 2. The second run of 12 episodes, officially known as Season 3, premiered on 24 January 2020 on Sky 1. Season 4, consisting of 12 episodes, premiered on 8 October 2022.

Netflix exclusively streams the series in the U.S., Canada, Australia, and New Zealand.

Plot 
The series is set in Berlin during the latter years of the Weimar Republic, beginning in 1929. It follows Gereon Rath (Volker Bruch), a police inspector on assignment from Cologne who is on a secret mission to dismantle an extortion ring, and Charlotte Ritter (Liv Lisa Fries), police clerk by day, prostitute by night, who aspires to become a police inspector.

Cast

Main 
 Volker Bruch as Inspector Gereon Rath, a combat veteran of the Imperial German Army during World War I and a policeman newly transferred from his home town of Cologne to Berlin; he struggles with  morphine dependence linked to his war experiences, particularly his survivor's guilt over the loss of his brother (seasons 1–4)
 Liv Lisa Fries as Charlotte Ritter ("Lotte"), a flapper from the slums of Neukölln and an occasional prostitute at the Moka Efti cabaret, who works as a police clerk and dreams of becoming the first female homicide detective in the history of the Berlin Police (seasons 1–4)
 Peter Kurth as Detective Chief Inspector (DCI) Bruno Wolter, a Berlin Police investigator whose affability masks unseemly tendencies; he becomes the primary antagonist in season 2 (seasons 1–2)
 Matthias Brandt as Councillor August Benda, the Jewish chief of the "Political Police" department of the Berlin Police. A tenacious investigator and true believer in the Weimar Republic, Benda is equally loathed by monarchists, communists, and Nazis; for years, he has been investigating the Black Reichswehr (seasons 1–2)
 Leonie Benesch as Greta Overbeck, a down-on-her-luck childhood friend of Charlotte Ritter who eventually finds a job as domestic servant to Councillor Benda and his family and reluctantly gets entwined in an assassination scheme (seasons 1–3)
 Severija Janušauskaitė as Countess Svetlana Sorokina ("Sveta")/ Nikoros, a White Russian émigré, crossdressing singer at the Moka Efti cabaret, and spy for the Soviet secret police (seasons 1-2)
 Ivan Shvedoff as Alexei Kardakov, an anti-Stalinist Russian refugee and the leader of a fictional Trotskyist cell in Berlin called the "Red Fortress" (season 1; guest season 2)
 Lars Eidinger as Alfred Nyssen, a steel manufacturer with links to Reichswehr and Freikorps officers plotting to overthrow the Republic and restore Kaiser Wilhelm II to the German throne and who detests the ruling Social Democratic Party of Germany (seasons 1-4)
  as Stephan Jänicke, a young detective in the Berlin Police who has been assigned by Councillor Benda to investigate Wolter for ties to the Black Reichswehr (season 1; recurring season 2)
 Mišel Matičević as Edgar Kasabian, "The Armenian", the impeccably dressed owner of the Moka Efti cabaret and the leader of organized crime in Berlin; a ruthless but deeply principled gangster, he acts as a secret protector to Inspector Gereon Rath for personal reasons (season 1-3; recurring season 4)
 Henning Peker as Franz Krajewski, a drug addict who works as a police informant (season 1; guest season 3)
 Fritzi Haberlandt as Elisabeth Behnke, a kind friend of Bruno Wolter who maintains a boarding house where Inspector Rath stays (seasons 1–4)
 Karl Markovics as Samuel Katelbach, an eccentric writer and sometimes journalist who befriends Rath at the boarding house (seasons 1–4)
 Jens Harzer as Dr. Anno Schmidt, a mysterious doctor whose atypical practices are considered fringe by the Berlin medical community but heralded by others, including The Armenian (seasons 1–4)
 Ernst Stötzner as Major General Wilhelm Seegers, a member of the Reichswehr's General Staff and DCI Bruno Wolter's commanding officer during the Great War; he opposes the Republic and is up to many secret activities (seasons 1–2; guest seasons 3-4)
 Jördis Triebel as Dr. Völcker, a communist doctor who disagrees with the practices of the Berlin police department (seasons 1–4)
 Christian Friedel as Reinhold Gräf, a photographer for the Berlin police department who works closely with Rath (seasons 1–4)
  as Col. Trokhin, a Soviet diplomat and official of Stalin's secret police who targets anti-Stalinists (seasons 1–2)
 Hannah Herzsprung as Helga Rath, Inspector Gereon Rath's secret lover of more than ten years and the wife of his brother, who has been missing since the First World War (seasons 2–4; recurring season 1)
 Ivo Pietzcker as Moritz Rath, Gereon Rath's nephew and Helga's son whose curiosity gets him into trouble (seasons 2,4; recurring season 3)
 Benno Fürmann as Colonel Gottfried Wendt, an ambitious and untrustworthy political police counselor who is a power player with the NSDAP (seasons 2-4; guest season 1)
 Ronald Zehrfeld as Walter Weintraub, the mysterious and ruthless partner of The Armenian who returns from time in prison (seasons 3-4)
 Meret Becker as Esther Kasabian, a former actress married to The Armenian who dreams of returning to acting as well as reconciling the men she loves (seasons 3-4)
 Udo Samel as Ernst "Buddha" Gennat, the stern but kind head of Berlin's Homicide Department, based on a real director of the Berlin criminal police (seasons 3-4; recurring season 2)
 Luc Feit as Leopold Ullrich, detail-oriented police analyst (season 3; recurring season 2)
 Trystan Pütter as Hans Litten, a pro bono attorney interested in Greta's case, based on a real lawyer (seasons 3-4)
 Thorsten Merten as Henning, a homicide investigator working under Rath with Czerwinski (seasons 3-4; recurring seasons 1–2)
 Rüdiger Klink as Czerwinski, a homicide investigator working under Rath with Henning (seasons 3-4; recurring seasons 1–2)
 Godehard Giese as Wilhelm Böhm, a high-ranking homicide detective who often clashes with Rath and Ritter (seasons 3-4; recurring seasons 1–2)
 Saskia Rosendahl as Marie-Luise Seegers, a communist law student who disagrees with her father General Seegers (seasons 3-4)
 Sabin Tambrea as Tristan Rot, aka Herbert Plumpe, widower of Betty Winter, a melodramatic actor with an interest in the occult (season 3)
 Julius Feldmeier as Otto Wollenberg/Horst Kessler, a friend of Fritz with villainous intentions (season 3; recurring seasons 1–2)
 Jacob Matschenz as Fritz Hockert/Richard Pechtmann, a friend of Otto with villainous intentions (season 3; recurring seasons 1–2)
 Irene Böhm as Toni Ritter, Charlotte's younger sister (season 4; recurring seasons 1–3)
 Hans-Marrin Stier as Albert Grzesinski, Zörgiebel’s successor (season 4; guest season 3)
 Hanno Koffler as Walter Stennes, a young Nazi lieutenant who collaborates covertly with Wendt (season 4; recurring season 3)
 Martin Wuttke as Gustav Heymann (season 4; recurring season 3)
 Sebastian Urzendowsky as Max Fuchs (season 4; recurring seasons 1-3)
 Mark Ivanir as Abe Gold (season 4)
 Moisej Bazijan as Jakob Grün (season 4)
 Marie-Anne Fliegel as Annemarie Nyssen, Alfred’s mother (season 4; recurring seasons 1-3)
 Holger Handtke as Georg Wegener, the Nyssen family lawyer and Alfred’s confidant (season 4; recurring seasons 1-3)
 Peter Jordan as Fred Jacoby, a journalist and Gräf’s romantic partner (season 4; recurring season 3)

Recurring 

 Laura Kiehne as Ilse Ritter, Charlotte's older sister (seasons 1-3)
 Pit Bukowski as Erich Ritter, Ilse's husband (seasons 1-2; guest season 3)
 Anton Rattinger as Dr. Joseph Schwarz, a forensic pathologist at the University of Berlin (seasons 1-4)
 Lilli Fichtner as Doris, a friend of Charlotte (seasons 1-4)
 Johann Jürgens as Rudi Malzig, a medical student and friend of Charlotte and Stephan (seasons 1,4; guest seasons 2-3)
 Marie Gruber as Emmi Wolter, Bruno's wife (seasons 1-2)
 Jeanette Hain as Irmgard Benda, August’s wife (season 1-3)
 Emil von Schönfels as Arndt Scheer, a young member of the SA and a friend of Moritz who has sexual relations with Wendt (seasons 3-4; guest season 1)
 Caro Cult as Vera Lohmann, an actress who replaces Betty Winter in the film Demons of Passion after her murder (season 3)
 Bernhard Schütz as Jo Bellmann, a film director (season 3)
 Jenny Schily as Rosa Helfers, the warden of Barnimstraße prison (season 3-4)
 Lola Witzmann as Renate Cziczewicz, a young girl and vagrant who befriends Toni (seasons 3-4)
 Lenn Kudrjawizki as Oskar Kulanin (season 4)
 Sascha Nathan as Hermann Blank, editor-in-chief of a Nazi newspaper (season 4)
 Joachim Meyerhoff as Richter Voss, a corrupt judge and leader of the White Hand (season 4)
 Barbara Philipp as Iron-Else, a mob boss (season 4)
 Hannes Wegener as Johann “Rukeli” Trollmann, a German Sinti boxer and suspected half-brother of Charlotte (season 4)

Overview

Production

Development 

The series was co-directed by Tom Tykwer, and Achim von Borries, who also wrote the scripts. The 16 episodes of the first two seasons were adapted by Tykwer, von Borries and Handloegten from the novel Der nasse Fisch (The Wet Fish) (2008) by Volker Kutscher and were filmed over eight months beginning in May 2016.

German public broadcaster ARD and pay TV channel Sky co-produced the series, a first time collaboration in German television. As part of the arrangement, Sky broadcast the series first, and ARD started broadcasts by free-to-air television on 30 September 2018. Netflix purchased rights for the United States, Canada, and Australia, where the series became available in 2018 with English dubbing and subtitles.

The series is described as the most expensive television drama series in Germany, with a budget of €40 million that increased to €55 million due to reshoots.

Later seasons 

The third season of Babylon Berlin was filmed over six months from late 2018 to May 2019. At the 32nd European Film Awards in December 2019, showrunners Achim von Borries, Henk Handloegten and Tom Tykwer stated that the third season was in post-production and that a fourth season was planned.

The third season was developed loosely around the second novel in Volker Kutscher's trilogy The Silent Death. The showrunners chose to diverge from the source material to better address the social and political unrest during the time period as they felt that the Weimar Republic is often overlooked by both media and historical sources. The third season is set in late 1929 around the Black Tuesday stock market crash and navigates the rise of the subversive Black Reichswehr and Communist political groups as well as the advent of talkies.

In a January 2020 interview with Berliner Zeitung, actress Liv Lisa Fries said that production would likely begin on the fourth season in late 2020 or early 2021. Planning and writing for the fourth season, based on the novel Goldstein, began in October 2020. Filming began in early 2021 and was completed in September 2021, with the production having shot for 129 days at Studio Babelsberg and at locations around Berlin. Season 4 is set in late 1930 and early 1931. It premiered on 8 October 2022.

The creators of Babylon Berlin have stated in numerous interviews that they intend to end the series at the year 1933, with the assumption of power by Hitler and the National Socialist German Workers Party. While the novels are set one per year, and have currently reached 1937, the seasons of the series have not followed that model, with Seasons 1, 2 and 3 all set in 1929 and Season 4 set in 1930–1.

Handloegten has stated that:

We decided to go on until 1933... if you call the show Babylon Berlin, it is about this special city in a very special time. And this special time, the Babylon times, the free and liberated times, just ended in 1933.

von Borries has spoken along similar lines, saying:

We always said it was over in 1933. If there is a final season, it would be the first months after the so-called seizure of power before the Reichstag fire. The National Socialists had turned the country upside down so fundamentally that the Babylonian in Berlin was over. After that we don't want to go on.

Era 
In an interview with The Wall Street Journal, one of the show's co-creators, Tom Tykwer, spoke about the era:

At the time people did not realize how absolutely unstable this new construction of society which the Weimar Republic represented was. It interested us because the fragility of democracy has been put to the test quite profoundly in recent years... By 1929, new opportunities were arising. Women had more possibilities to take part in society, especially in the labour market as Berlin became crowded with new thinking, new art, theatre, music and journalistic writing.

Nonetheless, Tykwer insisted that he and his co-directors were determined not to idealize the Weimar Republic: "People tend to forget that it was also a very rough era in German history. There was a lot of poverty, and people who had survived the war were suffering from a great deal of trauma."

In the first season, communists, Soviets and especially Trotskyists play a prominent role (the Soviet ambassador to Germany from 1923 to 1930 was former Trotsky ally Nikolay Krestinsky). The show depicts what became known as Blutmai, violence between Communist demonstrators and members of the Berlin Police in early May 1929, and extra-legal paramilitary formations promoted by the German Army, known as the Black Reichswehr. In the first season, the Soviet ambassador in Berlin, who appears to be a loyal Stalinist, is involved in the massacre of Trotskyists in the printing shop, who were buried in a mass grave outside the city. According to Nathaniel Flakin, this event never happened. Nazi Party leader Adolf Hitler, on the other hand, is only mentioned in passing during the first two seasons of Babylon Berlin.

Locations 

Babelsberg Studio constructed a massive addition to its Metropolitan Backlot for the filming of the series and for future productions. This permanent standing set is billed as one of the largest in Europe. The set includes recreations of various Berlin neighbourhoods, from a range of economic classes. It also includes the large exterior of the night club Moka Efti.

In addition, the series was filmed throughout Berlin and at other locations in the surrounding state of Brandenburg. Numerous scenes were filmed on Alexanderplatz in front of the historic . The police headquarters, once located directly behind it, and other surrounding buildings, were destroyed in WWII, but were recreated with computer simulations. The Rotes Rathaus (Berlin City Hall) was used for most closeup scenes involving the exterior of the police headquarters, because their red brick appearance and architectural style are very similar. Interiors of the police headquarters lobby were filmed at the Rathaus Schöneberg, including scenes with its paternoster elevator, while the elegant Ratskeller restaurant in the same building was used as the nearby café  in multiple scenes. Other interior scenes in the police headquarters were filmed in the historic .

Interior scenes in the Moka Efti were filmed at the 'Delphi Cinema' in Berlin-Weissensee. Bar Tausend, in Berlin served as the show's Holländer Bar. A lengthy suspense sequence set during a performance of The Threepenny Opera, was filmed at the historic Theater am Schiffbauerdamm, where the play actually ran at the time. The  in Prenzlauer Berg was used for scenes of Anno and Helga's wedding. The headquarters of the Katholischer Studentenverein Askania-Burgundia Berlin, located in a villa in Dahlem, were used for the residence of Councillor Benda and his family. The interiors and exteriors of the historic former  were used as numerous locations in the series, including as the exterior of the Soviet Embassy. Because the complex was empty at the time of filming, it was also used as the production headquarters, and to house the show's thousands of costumes.

Portions of the series were also filmed in the state of North Rhine-Westphalia. Scenes set at Schloss Liebenberg, the estate of the Nyssen family, were filmed at Schloss Drachenburg, a castle in the Rhineland. The  in Cologne was used as the Anhalter Güterbahnhof. The Landschaftspark Duisburg-Nord, a disused steel plant near Duisburg, was used as the factory adjacent to Bruno Wolter's apartment, in which numerous sequences take place.

Scenes involving a steam train were filmed in the state of Bavaria at the Bavarian Railway Museum near Nördlingen.

A number of new locations were introduced in Season 3. Berlin's Old City Hall served as the interior and exterior of the Berlin Stock Exchange. The Ullsteinhaus was used as the editorial offices of the Tempo (newspaper) newspaper, which were actually located there at the time. The Kammergericht in Berlin served as the Ministry of the Reichswehr. The Cafe Grosz doubled for the historic Romanisches Café, destroyed in WWII. The Gästehaus am Lehnitzsee, a hotel housed in the historic , the pre-WWII mansion of Louis Adlon, manager of the famed Hotel Adlon, was used as the villa of Edgar and Esther Kasabian. The exterior of Gereon & Helga Rath's apartment was filmed at Woelckpromenade in Berlin-Weißensee.

New locations introduced in Season 4 include the Karl-Marx-Allee, used in multiple episodes as the Kurfürstendamm; the Amtsgericht Wedding, the exterior and interior of which appear in multiple episodes as the Landgericht Berlin-Mitte; and the GASAG Building on Littenstraße, used as the Berlin headquarters of the Nazi party.

Music 

In 2018, the show formed an in-house band, The Moka Efti Orchestra, to perform the original music from the show. The group plays period-era music in a variety of styles ranging from ragtime to klezmer. Named after the nightclub featured in Babylon Berlin, The Moka Efti Orchestra is a 14-member group and is fronted by the Lithuanian actress Severija Janušauskaitė as Svetlana Sorokina. In the first double episode of the first season, Janušauskaitė's character, crossdressing as the male singer Nikoros, performs the main theme of the series, "" in the Moka Efti cabaret. This song was later released and charted on the German singles chart.

The group performed in concert in May 2018 and, due to popular demand, toured the country later that year. With the release of the third season of the show, the musical group released their debut album  (English: First Edition).

In addition to period music, "Dance Away", from the 1979 album Manifesto by Roxy Music, plays occasionally in the background (adapted to the style of the period) and also included is an adaptation of "These Foolish Things" and, in the Season Two finale, a Russian version of "Gloomy Sunday". Singer Bryan Ferry of Roxy Music appears toward the end of the first season as a cabaret singer performing "Bitter-Sweet", half in English, half in German, from the 1974 album Country Life.

A major action sequence in season two takes place during a performance of The Threepenny Opera. The song "" ("The Ballad of Mack the Knife") is featured in that scene, and also as a plot device. Two different characters hum the tune, giving detective Rath clues to the unfolding plot.

Broadcast 

Babylon Berlin premiered in Germany on 13 October 2017 (Sky 1) and in the United Kingdom and the Republic of Ireland on Sunday, 5 November 2017 (Sky Atlantic). The series debuted in Australia, Canada, and the United States on 30 January 2018 (Netflix). Broadcasting on the German TV channel Das Erste started Sunday 30 September 2018. The Swedish broadcast began on 19 June 2019 on SVT.

After early indications of a late 2019 premiere, the third season premiered in Germany on Sky 1 in January 2020; and subsequently on German public television station ARD in October 2020. The international distribution rights for the third season were sold to more than one hundred countries and many different networks including Netflix, HBO Europe, and Viaplay in early 2019.

In territories where the show is distributed by Netflix, the third season was released in its entirety on 1 March 2020.

Episodes 
The first and second seasons, of eight episodes each, were written as one story (covering the first novel of the Kutscher book series) and filmed as one production. They premiered as one block, numbered 1–16 and have been broadcast throughout the world en bloc. In addition, all 16 episodes of both seasons were made available simultaneously on Netflix. In many territories the show was broadcast as a season comprising eight double-length episodes.

The second block of 12 episodes are officially known as Season 3 but were broadcast as Season 2 in some territories where the previous episodes premiered as one block.

Season 1 (2017) 
All episodes were written and directed by Henk Handloegten, Achim von Borries, and Tom Tykwer.

Season 2 (2017) 

The second-season episodes were written and directed by Henk Handloegten, Achim von Borries, and Tom Tykwer.

Season 3 (2020)

Season 4 (2022)

Critical reception 

On Rotten Tomatoes the first season holds approval rating of 100% based on 30 reviews, with the critics consensus reading: "Babylon Berlins humor and humanity pair nicely with its hypnotic visuals, resulting in a show that dazzles within its oversaturated genre." As of April 2019, Babylon Berlin was the highest rated non-English language show on Sky TV.

Carolin Ströbele of Die Zeit praised the pilot, saying that it "is highly dynamic and unites sex, crime and history in a pleasantly unobtrusive manner." Christian Buss, cultural critic from Der Spiegel, praised the series for staying true to the tradition of "typically German angst cinema", in the vein of 1920s silent movies such as Fritz Lang's Metropolis or Robert Wiene's The Cabinet of Dr. Caligari. "It could be that Babylon Berlin is the first big German TV production since Das Boot which enjoys really relevant success abroad. Let's not be shy to say it: we [Germans] are big again – as the world champions of angst."

Accolades 

The series itself received several awards in 2018. These included a Bambi in the category Beste Serie des Jahres (Best series of the year), four awards at the Deutscher Fernsehpreis (best dramatical series; best cinematography for Frank Griebe, Bernd Fischer and Philip Haberlandt; best musical score for Johnny Klimek and Tom Tykwer; and best production design for Pierre-Yves Gayraud and Uli Hanisch), a special Bavarian TV Award and a Romy for TV event of the year. In the same year, everyone majorly involved with the production of the series won a Grimme-Preis, including Volker Bruch, Liv Lisa Fries, Peter Kurth, the three directors and several members of the technical team. Bruch also won a Goldene Kamera in the category Best German actor for his portrayal of Gereon Rath.

The series' opening title sequence, created by German designer Saskia Marka and featuring a theme composed by Johnny Klimek and Tom Tykwer, was named the best title sequence of 2018 by industry website Art of the Title.

In December 2019, the European Film Academy awarded the series with the inaugural Achievement in Fiction Series Award at the European Film Awards.

Awards

See also 
 1920s Berlin
 Adolf Hitler's rise to power
 Roaring Twenties
 Golden Twenties
 Weimar culture
 Berlin Alexanderplatz (1980 miniseries)
 Cabaret

Notes

References

Further reading 

 Official site of the Metropolitan Backlot (primary location for the show)
 "Babylon Berlin – Our wild years" Interview with Volker Kutscher at Frankfurter Allgemeine Zeitung website
 "Dancing on the Volcano" at Frankfurter Allgemeine Zeitung website
 "Record budget for Babylon Berlin" at Spiegel Online website
 "Top event for broadcast, telecoms, media and entertainment industries"  at Medien Business website
 "Filming by helicopter on 1 November 2016 for the Babylon Berlin crime series" at Woernitz Franken's website
 A site with background information Historical figures appearing in the series, Berlin history, music
 Alban Bargain-Villéger. The Babylon of Interwar Berlin. Active History July 11, 2018
 Christine Lehnen. 'Babylon Berlin' set in Germany's dark 1930s. DW 8 October 2022 Season 4

External links 
 
 

2017 German television series debuts
Fiction set in 1929
German crime television series
German drama television series
2010s German police procedural television series
2020s German police procedural television series
German-language television shows
Das Erste original programming
Television shows based on German novels
Television shows set in Berlin
Television series set in the 1920s
Television series set in the 1930s
Post-traumatic stress disorder in fiction
Grimme-Preis for fiction winners
Neo-noir television series
World War I in popular culture
Weimar Republic
Flappers